The Hannover Indians are a professional German ice hockey team and public limited company from Hanover in Lower Saxony, Germany, which was renamed in 2006 from the Kleefelder Eissportverein (KEV) to the EC Hannover Indians. Since 2002 the team had played in the Oberliga and was promoted to the 2nd Division in 2008.

In 2013 they had to declare bankruptcy and automatically dropped down to the third-tier Oberliga.  Due to the massive financial support of fans and sponsors the club was able to furthermore participate in the competition. They ended the 2013-2014 season in third place.

Season records

Tournament results

External links

References

Hannover Indians bancruptficial
Official Club website
 

Ice hockey teams in Germany
Ice hockey clubs established in 1948
Sport in Hanover
Deutsche Eishockey Liga teams